Uncle Albert is the fictional character in the Only Fools and Horses television series.

Uncle Albert may also refer to:
 "Uncle Albert/Admiral Halsey", 1971 song by Paul and Linda McCartney on the Ram album
 Albert Tatlock, fictional character on the Coronation Street television series, known in his later years as Uncle Albert
 Uncle Albert, fictional character in the Car Wars game
 Uncle Albert, fictional character in Mary Poppins (book series) and adaptions
 Uncle Albert, fictional allegory of Albert Einstein in a series of children's novels by Russell Stannard
 'Uncle Albert', nickname given to military man Albert Kesselring